Young Actors' Retreat is a South Korean entertainment program planned by Kim Seong-yoon, featuring the cast members of Kim's previously directed television series Love in the Moonlight (2016), Itaewon Class (2020), and The Sound of Magic (2022). It premiered on TVING on September 9, 2022.

Overview
Members of each drama team mix together, play various MT games, and travel together, building new friendships and creating pleasant memories.

Cast members

Episodes

Production
In May 2022, Kim Seong-yoon was reported to be planning a new travel entertainment program with the actors who appeared in the works he directed and several actors were reportedly considering the offer. On June 30, casting of the 15 actors was confirmed by TVING.

Release
Episodes 1 and 2 was released on TVING at 16:00 (KST) on September 9, 2022, and a total of 8 episodes will be released every Friday for 7 weeks.

Soundtrack
 Tracklist

Notes

References

External links
  
 
 Young Actors' Retreat at Daum 

TVING original programming
2022 South Korean television series debuts
2022 South Korean television series endings
Korean-language television shows
South Korean television shows
South Korean travel television series
South Korean reality television series